Voronino is a rural locality (a village) in Ust-ALexeyevskoye Rural Settlement, Velikoustyugsky District, Vologda Oblast, Russia. The population was 4 as of 2002.

Geography 
Voronino is located 65 km southeast of Veliky Ustyug (the district's administrative centre) by road. Kochurino is the nearest rural locality.

References 

Rural localities in Velikoustyugsky District